Steneosaurus (from  , 'narrow' and  , 'lizard') is a dubious genus of teleosaurid crocodyliform from the Middle or Late Jurassic (Callovian or early Oxfordian) of France. The genus has been used as a wastebasket taxon for thalattosuchian fossils for over two centuries, and almost all known historical species of teleosauroid have been included within it at one point. The genus has remained a wastebasket, with numerous species still included under the label ‘Steneosaurus’, many of which are unrelated to each other (either paraphyletic or polyphyletic with respect to each other and other genera of teleosauroids).

Discovery and assigned species 
 
The type species, S. rostromajor, was only formally recognised as such in 2020, and this revision determined the type specimen of Steneosaurus was undiagnostic, and so declared the genus Steneosaurus a nomen dubium. The history of this specimen has been detailed in 2017. It was discovered in three pieces by abbot Charles Bacheley (1716-1795) in the Vaches Noires near Villers-sur-Mer (Calvados, France). Bacheley offered these pieces to Alexandre Besson (1725-1809) who had built up an important cabinet of fossils and minerals in Paris. Besson gave one of the pieces (the posterior portion) to Barthélémy Faujas de Saint-Fond (1841-1819), professor of geology in the Muséum national d'Histoire naturelle, Paris. Georges Cuvier first illustrated in 1808 the two anterior pieces of the specimen kept in the Besson collection  and then figured the third piece (posterior portion from the Faujas de Saint-Fond collection) in 1824 in association with the anterior pieces (Besson collection) and other cranial remains belonging to Metriorhynchidae.

The remaining species referred to Steneosaurus thus require new generic names, and some species have already been assigned to new genera prior to Steneosaurus being declared a nomen dubium.

Species in this genus are traditionally classed into two skull groups: longirostrine (long, narrow jaws) and mesorostrine (slightly shorter jaws).

Longirostrine
 S.' atelestatus  - Oxfordian Marnes de Villers of France
 S.' blumembachi  - Oxfordian Marnes de Villers of France
 S.' oplites  - Toarcian La Caine-Curcy of France
 '''S.' rudis  - France

 Reassigned species 
 Steneosaurus' baroni  = Andrianavoay
 Steneosaurus' bollensis  = Macrospondylus
 S.' bouchardi -  = Proexochokefalos Steneosaurus' boutilieri  = Yvridiosuchus Steneosaurus' brevior  = Mystriosaurus Steneosaurus' deslongchampsianus 
 Steneosaurus' edwardsi  = Neosteneosaurus '''Steneosaurus' gracilirostris  = Plagiophthalmosuchus
 Steneosaurus' heberti  = Proexochokefalos
 Steneosaurus' larteti  = Deslongchampsina
 Steneosaurus' leedsi  = Charitomenosuchus
 Steneosaurus' megarhinus  = Bathysuchus
 Steneosaurus' megistorhynchus  = Seldsienean '''Steneosaurus' obtusidens  = Lemmysuchus

 Classification 
A 2005 phylogenetic analysis into the evolutionary relationships of Thalattosuchia did not support the monophyly of Steneosaurus, as the genera Machimosaurus and Teleosaurus both fell within Steneosaurus. Reinforcing the paraphyly of Steneosaurus, the Callovian species "Steneosaurus" obtusidens has been recovered as the sister species of Machimosaurus in recent cladistic analyses of Thalattosuchia and renamed Lemmysuchus, while Steneosaurus' bollensis was recovered in a basal position to other members of Steneosaurus sensu lato''.

See also 

 List of marine reptiles

References

External links 

 Angellis Net pdf

Thalattosuchians
Prehistoric pseudosuchian genera
Prehistoric marine crocodylomorphs
Early Jurassic crocodylomorphs
Middle Jurassic crocodylomorphs
Aalenian life
Bajocian life
Bathonian life
Callovian life
Toarcian life
Early Jurassic reptiles of Europe
Middle Jurassic reptiles of Europe
Fossils of England
Oxford Clay
Fossils of France
Fossils of Germany
Solnhofen fauna
Jurassic reptiles of Africa
Fossils of Morocco
Fossils of Tunisia
Fossil taxa described in 1825
Nomina dubia